New Lane railway station serves the town of Burscough in West Lancashire, in England. It is served and managed by Northern Trains and is situated near the Martin Mere bird sanctuary, which can be reached by a 1-mile walk.

The main stone-built station building survives adjacent to the Wigan-bound platform, but is now in use for non-railway purposes (as a private house), modest shelters now being provided on both platforms for rail travellers.

History
The station was built by the Manchester and Southport Railway and opened on 9 April 1855, and from January 1885 was part of the Lancashire and Yorkshire Railway (L&YR). The main stone-built station building (no longer in use) was built during this time, in the standard L&YR style (albeit on a smaller scale compared with Burscough Bridge). The L&YR amalgamated with the London and North Western Railway on 1 January 1922 and in turn was grouped into the London, Midland and Scottish Railway (LMS) in 1923. Nationalisation followed in 1948. When Sectorisation was introduced in the 1980s, the station was served by Regional Railways until the privatisation of British Rail.  Like neighbouring , the station here formerly had its level crossing manually operated from a nearby signal box and both platforms on the same side of the crossing.  The present staggered arrangement was introduced when the box was abolished and automatic half barriers installed in the early 1990s.

Facilities
The station is unstaffed and has a ticket machine, tickets can be purchased on the train or prior to travel.  Timetable posters and a telephone are provided to give train running information.  Step-free access is available to both platforms.

Services
Trains run to Southport and Manchester Victoria via Wigan Wallgate every two hours (with some peak extras).

The last service to Southport is at 21:24 hours with the last service towards Wigan Wallgate and Manchester stations being at 22:32. There is no Sunday service, though a normal service operates on most bank holidays.

References

External links

Railway stations in the Borough of West Lancashire
DfT Category F2 stations
Former Lancashire and Yorkshire Railway stations
Northern franchise railway stations
Railway stations in Great Britain opened in 1855
1855 establishments in England
Burscough